Najmabad (also Romanized as Najmābād) is a village in Bahreman Rural District, Nuq District, Rafsanjan County, Kerman Province, Iran. At the 2006 census, its population was 261, in 69 families.

References 

Populated places in Rafsanjan County